Live at Cardiff Castle is a DVD released by Welsh Rock trio, Stereophonics. The DVD features live recordings from a concert at Cardiff Castle on 12 June 1998.

Track listing
 Looks Like Chaplin
 Check My Eyelids For Holes
 "The Bartender and the Thief"
 Same Size Feet
 Traffic
 Too Many Sandwiches
 Not Up To You
 T-shirt Suntan
 "A Thousand Trees"
 Carrot Cake And Wine
 Is Yesterday, Tomorrow, Today?
 Goldfish Bowl
 Last of the Big Time Drinkers
 "Local Boy in the Photograph"
 She Takes Her Clothes Off
 "I Wouldn't Believe Your Radio"
 Billy Davey's Daughter
 Raymond's Shop
 "More Life in a Tramps Vest"

Stereophonics video albums
V2 Records video albums
1998 video albums